In coordinate geometry, Section formula is used to find the ratio in which a line segment is divided by a point internally or externally. It is used to find out the centroid, incenter and excenters of a triangle. In physics, it is used to find the center of mass of systems, equilibrium points, etc.

Internal Divisions 

Proof 
Triangles .

External Divisions 

If a point P (lying on the extension of AB) divides AB in the ratio m:n then

Proof

Midpoint formula 

The midpoint of a line segment divides it internally in the ratio . Applying the Section formula for internal division:

Derivation

Centroid

The centroid of a triangle is the intersection of the medians and divides each median in the ratio .
Using the section formula, the centroid becomes:

In 3-Dimensions 
Let A and B be two points with Cartesian coordinates (x1, y1, z1) and (x2, y2, z2) and P be a point on the line through A and B. If . Then the section formulae give the coordinates of P as

In vectors 

 in the ratio  internally, is given by 
 in the ratio  externally, is given by

See also 

 Cross-section Formula
 Distance Formula
 Midpoint Formula

References

External links 
 section-formula by GeoGebra

Analytic geometry